D'Arcy Wood may refer to the following individuals:

 H. D'Arcy Wood, a past President of the Assembly of the Uniting Church in Australia and hymnologist
 Gillen D'Arcy Wood, assistant professor of English at the University of Illinois at Urbana-Champaign and author